Question 1 is the name of various ballot measures:

2020 Iowa Question 1, an Iowa ballot question on holding a constitutional convention
 Maine Question 1 (disambiguation):
2009 Maine Question 1, a 2009 people's veto referendum to repeal a same-sex marriage law
2011 Maine Question 1. a 2011 people's veto referendum to repeal  a law ending Election Day voter registration 
2012 Maine Question 1, a 2012 citizen-initiated  referendum to legalize same-sex marriage
2014 Maine Question 1, a 2014 citizen-initiated  referendum to ban certain bear hunting methods
2015 Maine Question 1, a 2015 citizen-initiated referendum to revise the Maine Clean Elections Act
2016 Maine Question 1, a 2016 citizen-initiated referendum to legalize the recreational use of marijuana.
2017 Maine Question 1, a 2017 citizen-initiated referendum to legalize the construction of a casino in York County
June 2018 Maine Question 1, a 2018 people's veto referendum to repeal a law delaying ranked-choice voting.
November 2018 Maine Question 1, a 2018 citizen-initiated referendum to pass a law creating a home health care program for the elderly and disabled
Massachusetts Question 1 (disambiguation)
Abolishing the state income tax, 2002 ballot
Sale of wine by food stores, 2006 ballot
2008 Massachusetts Question 1, the Massachusetts State Income Tax Repeal Initiative
2010 Massachusetts Question 1, the Massachusetts No Sales Tax for Alcohol Initiative
2012 Massachusetts Question 1, the Massachusetts Right to Repair Initiative (2012)
2014 Massachusetts Question 1, the Massachusetts Automatic Gas Tax Increase Repeal Initieative
2016 Massachusetts Question 1, the Massachusetts Expand Slot Machine Gaming Initiative
Nurse-Patient Assignment Limits, 2018 ballot
2020 Massachusetts Question 1, the Massachusetts Right to Repair Initiative (2020)
 2020 New Jersey Public Question 1, a New Jersey ballot question to legalize marijuana
 2020 Rhode Island Question 1, a Rhode Island ballot question to shorten the name of the state
 Virginia Question 1 (disambiguation):
2006 Virginia Question 1, a ballot question to prohibit same-sex marriage
2020 Virginia Question 1, a ballot question to change the congressional redistricting process